HMS Oakley was a Type II  of the Royal Navy. She was originally to have been named Tickham, however she was renamed after her sister ship Oakley was transferred to Poland and was renamed ORP Kujawiak (L72). She entered service in May 1943, carrying out convoy escort, patrol and anti-shipping attacks for most of the rest of the Second World War. She was adopted by the Civil community of Leighton Buzzard in Bedforshire as part of Warship Week in 1942. In 1957, she was sold to the West German Navy, serving as a training ship for the German Naval Gunnery school until scrapped in 1972.

Construction
HMS Oakley was ordered from Yarrows on 20 December 1939, one of 16 Type II Hunt-class destroyers ordered from various shipbuilders on that date, (including two from Yarrows). The Hunts were meant to fill the Royal Navy's need for a large number of small destroyer-type vessels capable of both convoy escort and operations with the fleet. The Type II Hunts differed from the earlier ships in having increased beam in order to improve stability and carry the ships' originally intended armament.

The ship intended to be HMS Tickham was laid down at Yarrow's Scotstoun, Glasgow shipyard on 19 August 1940, with construction being badly delayed by German bombing of the shipyard. Oakley was launched on 15 January 1942 and completed on 7 May 1942.

Displacement was  standard and   under full load.

The ship's main gun armament was six 4 inch (102 mm) QF Mk XVI dual purpose (anti-ship and anti-aircraft) guns in three twin mounts, with one mount forward and two aft. Additional close-in anti-aircraft armament was provided by a quadruple 2-pounder "pom-pom" mount and two single Oerlikon 20 mm cannon mounted in the bridge wings. Power-operated twin 20 mm Oerlikon mounts replaced the single Oerlikons during the war. Up to 110 depth charges could be carried. The ship had a complement of 168 officers and men.

Royal Navy service
After rectification of defects found during the ship's sea trials, Oakley  sailed for Scapa Flow in the Orkneys on 22 June 1942, and took part in escorting a minelaying operation and in a diversion operation intended to distract German attentions from the Arctic Convoy PQ 17. After completion of these operations, Oakley completed working up her crew, becoming a part of the Orkney and Shetland Command, where her main duties consisted of escorting convoys to and from the Faroe Islands. In September 1942, the Royal Navy sailed the next major supply convoy to the Soviet Union, Convoy PQ 18, and Oakley was again involved in support operations for the convoy. It was decided to set up a temporary refueling base for the convoy's escorts at Lowe Sound, Spitsbergen, with Oakley part of the escort for the oilers that carried out these refueling operations. On 17 November 1942, the westbound convoy QP 15 sailed from Archangelsk in Northern Russia, with Oakley joining the escort of the Loch Ewe bound convoy on 23 November, continuing with the convoy, which was heavily disrupted by storms, until it reached Scotland.

In early 1943, Oakley was allocated to service in the Mediterranean, and sailed as part of the escort of Algiers-bound convoy KMF 9, reaching Oran in Algeria on 16 February, where she joined the 59th Destroyer Division. Oakleys normal duties with the 59th Division consisted of convoy escort and patrol duties in the Western and Central Mediterranean. By the end of April 1943, Allied armies were closing in on German and Italian troops in Tunisia, and on 8 May Admiral Cunningham, commander of the British Mediterranean Fleet, ordered Operation Retribution, a blockade of Tunisian ports by Allied sea and air forces to stop any evacuation of Axis troops to Sicily, with 18 destroyers, including Oakley, forming part of the blockading force. On 9 May, Oakley and sister ship  were operating off Cape Bon when, in a case of mistaken identity, the two destroyers were attacked by 18 Spitfire fighter aircraft, with Bicester receiving heavy damage from a near miss of a bomb.

On 8 July 1943, Oakley set out from Sfax in Tunisia as part of the escort of a convoy of 26 Landing Ship, Tanks carrying troops of the 51st (Highland) Division as part of the Allied invasion of Sicily. The convoy reached its assigned assault beach designated "Bark South", near Capo Passero at the South-east corner of Sicily on 10 July, with Oakley shelling Italian defences during the landings before returning to the duty of escorting transports between African ports and the invasion beaches. Oakley continued on escort duties in the Mediterranean for most of the rest of the year, but on 12 December, Oakley struck a submerged wreck at the entrance to Taranto harbor, seriously damaging the ship's hull and propellers.

Oakley was under repair at Taranto until April 1944, then sailed to Malta where she underwent a refit, rejoining the 59th Destroyer Division at Malta in June. In August 1944, Oakley took part in Operation Dragoon, the Allied Invasion of Southern France, continuing to escort convoys supporting the invasion until September 1944, when she returned to the 59th Division. In October 1944, Oakley took part in Operation Manna, the return of British and the forces of the Greek government-in-exile following the German withdrawal from Greece, supporting minesweeping operations and the re-occupation of Athens.

In January 1945, the naval threat in the Mediterranean having greatly reduced, Oakley returned to the United Kingdom, joining the 21st Destroyer Flotilla based at Sheerness for escort and patrol duties on the East coast of England before entering refit at Portsmouth in March that year. In April, Oakley, allocated to the East Indies Fleet, sailed to Taranto to complete the refit. The refit continued until September 1945, with Oakley returning to British waters in October. Oakley entered Category B reserve (for ships which were being kept for future service) at Portsmouth in December 1945. She underwent a refit in 1947, but remained in reserve until 1957 and transfer to the West German Navy.

Oakley was awarded battle honours for Arctic 1942, Sicily 1943, South France 1944 and North Sea 1945 for her service in the Second World War.

West German Navy service

In May 1956, Oakley was one of seven frigates selected for transfer to the new West German Navy for use as training ships, with the seven ships (Oakley, two Type II Hunts and four Black Swan class) being designated as Type 138 frigates by West Germany despite their dissimilar nature. Oakley was purchased by Germany on 11 November 1957, and refitted at Harland and Wolff at their Liverpool yard before being taken over on 2 October 1958. She was re-commissioned as Gneisenau (with the Pennant number F212) at Bremerhaven on 18 October 1958, serving as part of the Naval Gunnery School along with Scharnhorst (ex-). Early changes included fitting with stabilisers, radar and a cowl funnel, with close-in anti-aircraft armament changing to two 40 mm Bofors guns. Gneiseneau was further modified in 1961, with anti-submarine armament being removed and the main gun armament being reduced by the removal of a 4-inch mount.

From 28 October 1962, Gneisenau underwent a major refit at Howaldtswerke, Kiel, with a more modern armament and sensor outfit being added, and the ship's superstructure and masts being rebuilt. The 4-inch guns and 40 mm Bofors mounts were removed, with a single French 100 mm naval gun forward, and a close-in anti-aircraft armament of four L/70 40 mm Bofors guns, in one twin and two single mounts. Dutch DA02 air search radar and M40 fire control systems were fitted. Gneisenau re-entered service after this rebuilt on 5 March 1964. In 1965, Gneisenau became a stationary training ship, and went into reserve in 1968. She was stricken on 30 September 1972 and was cannibalized for spare parts at Wilhelmshaven before being sold in October 1968 and scrapped from 18 January 1977.

References

Publications
 
 
 
 
 
 
 
 
 
 
 
 
 
 
 

 

Hunt-class destroyers of the Royal Navy
Hunt-class destroyers of the German Navy
World War II destroyers of the United Kingdom
1942 ships

fi:HMS Oakley